Mystacides is a genus of long-horned caddisflies in the family Leptoceridae. There are more than 20 described species in Mystacides.

Species
These 24 species belong to the genus Mystacides:

 Mystacides absimilis Yang & Morse, 1997
 Mystacides alafimbriatus Hill-Griffin, 1912
 Mystacides azureus (Linnaeus, 1761)
 Mystacides bifidus Martynov, 1924
 Mystacides concolor Burmeister, 1839
 Mystacides dentatus Martynov, 1924
 Mystacides elongatus Yamamoto & Ross, 1966
 Mystacides fennica Kolenati, 1858
 Mystacides indicus Martynov, 1936
 Mystacides interjectus (Banks, 1914)
 Mystacides khasicus Kimmins, 1963
 Mystacides leucopterus McLachlan, 1884
 Mystacides longicornis (Linnaeus, 1758)
 Mystacides monochrous McLachlan, 1880
 Mystacides niger (Linnaeus, 1758)
 Mystacides nigra (Linnaeus, 1758)
 Mystacides pacificus Mey, 1991
 Mystacides pristinus Yang & Morse, 2000
 Mystacides sandersoni Yamamoto & Ross, 1966
 Mystacides schmidi Yang & Morse
 Mystacides sepulchralis (Walker, 1852) (black dancer)
 Mystacides sibiricus Martynov, 1935
 Mystacides superatus Yang & Morse, 2000
 Mystacides testaceus Navás, 1931

References

Further reading

External links

 

Trichoptera genera
Articles created by Qbugbot
Integripalpia